Kamuru (also Kamuru, Kamuru, Kamuru Ikulu) is a town in Zangon Kataf Local Government Area in southern Kaduna state in the Middle Belt region of Nigeria. It is the headquarters of the Akulu chiefdom. The postal code of the area is 802.

People

Language

See also
 List of villages in Kaduna State

References

Populated places in Kaduna State